David is a 1979 West German film by director Peter Lilienthal. It tells the story of a rabbi's son in Germany during the Holocaust, who tries to raise money to escape to Mandate Palestine.

Summary
David follows an adolescent Jewish boy, David Singer, who comes of age in Nazi Berlin. The film reveals the struggles for identity and survival that often overlapped among the Jews of war-torn Europe, particularly the young.

“Father says we must be proud of being Jewish, especially now,” David tells his brother Leo, who tries to camouflage his Jewish identity by wearing a Nazi uniform. But the yellow star that David and his fellow Jews are forced to wear is not a mark of Jewish pride. When Jews’ essential identity became a death sentence in Nazi Germany, its value was called into question for so many Jews who endured the Holocaust.

The film reveals the unfolding and progression of the war against the Jews in Germany, as seen from the limited perspective of one young boy. As he navigates through dangerous streets and railway cars, we observe with him the effects of Hitler’s policies on daily life in Berlin and on relations between Jews and non-Jews. Together with David, we witness the gradual but steady removal of the city’s Jews.

The film opens in pre-War Germany, depicting the young protagonist’s experience of the rampant anti-Semitism that would soon grow into the Holocaust. In the first scene, young David is harassed by a group of German schoolchildren who beat him and taunt him with the words “Jew pig.” Later, a communal celebration of Purim — the Jewish holiday that commemorates the saving of the Jews of ancient Persia from extermination — foreshadows the impending war. David’s father, the congregation rabbi, delivers a sermon that describes the attempted annihilation of the Purim story, a grim portent of what is to come. But the scene is a case of dramatic irony: Rabbi Singer is not aware of, or does not want to acknowledge, the relevance of his own words to the situation in early Nazi Germany. When, in the middle of the celebration, a group of Germans march by the synagogue chanting “Jews get out, Jews get out,” he insists that they are in fact only calling out to the city’s youth, that their chant is actually: “Youth come out, youth come out.”

The film is particularly compelling in its depiction of the intimate space of the Singer family and their interactions with one another — marked by love, devotion and the all-too-real fear of imminent loss and separation. When the rabbi is forced to watch his synagogue set aflame by the Nazis, and returns home with a swastika emblazoned on his head, he insists that the important thing is that the family is alive and together.

Awards
In 1979, David won three awards at the 29th Berlin International Film Festival:
Golden Bear - Peter Lilienthal
Interfilm Award - Peter Lilienthal
OCIC Award - Peter Lilenthal

The same year, David won two awards at the German Film Awards:
 Outstanding Individual Achievement- Walter Taub
 Outstanding Feature Film- David

Cast
Mario Fischel ... David Singer
Walter Taub ... Rabbi Singer
Irena Vrkljan ... Frau Singer - David's mother
Eva Mattes ... Toni
Dominique Horwitz ... Leo Singer
Torsten Henties ... David as child
Gustav Rudolf Sellner ... Dr. Grell (as Rudolph Sellner)
Erik Jelde (as Eric Jelde)
Nikolaus Dutsch ... Kohn
Sabine Andreas ... Rifka
Buddy Elias
Golda Tencer
Vladimir Weigl (as Vladimir Weigel)
Hanns Zischler (as Johann Zischler)

Reception
David was praised for its recreation of war-time Germany and its tendency towards understatement. The horrors of the Holocaust speak for themselves, not requiring overzealous emotionality from the actors or direction.

See also
 Holocaust survivors
 List of films featuring Berlin
 List of Holocaust films

Notes

References

External links
 David's review from The Jewish Channel
 
 New York Times Review
 MSN Movie Review
 

1979 films
1979 drama films
German drama films
West German films
1970s German-language films
Films about Nazi Germany
Holocaust films
Films set in Berlin
Films directed by Peter Lilienthal
Golden Bear winners
1970s German films